In the geologic time scale, the Changhsingian or Changxingian is the latest age or uppermost stage of the Permian. It is also the upper or latest of two subdivisions of the Lopingian Epoch or Series. It was preceded by the Wuchiapingian and followed by the Induan.

The greatest mass extinction in the Phanerozoic eon, the Permian–Triassic extinction event, occurred during this age.

Stratigraphic definitions
The Changhsingian is named after Changxing in northern Zhejiang, China. The stage was named for the Changhsing Limestone. The name was first used for a stage in 1970 and was anchored in the international timescale in 1981.

The base of the Changhsingian Stage is at the first appearance of the conodont species Clarkina wangi. The global reference profile is profile D at Meishan, in the type area in Changxing. The top of the Changhsingian (the base of the Induan Stage and the Triassic System is at the first appearance of the conodont species Hindeodus parvus.

The Changhsingian stage contains only one ammonite biozone: that of the genus Iranites.

Palaeontology
The Changhsingian ended with the Permian–Triassic extinction event when both global biodiversity and alpha diversity (community-level diversity) were devastated. The world after the extinction was almost lifeless, deserted, hot, and dry. Ammonoids, fishes, insects, and the tetrapods (cynodonts, amphibians, reptiles, therapsids, etc.) remained rare and terrestrial ecosystems did not recover for 30 million years.

References

External links
GeoWhen Database - Changhsingian
Upper Paleozoic stratigraphic chart at the website of the subcommission for stratigraphic information of the ICS

 
Permian geochronology
Geological ages